This is a list of buildings and structures in Saint Petersburg, Russia.

By alphabetical order

 Admiralty building
 Admiralty Shipyard
 Alexander Nevsky Lavra
Dukhovskaya Church
Annunciation Church of the Alexander Nevsky Lavra
Feodorovskaya Church
Gate Church
Holy Trinity Cathedral of the Alexander Nevsky Lavra
Kazachye Cemetery
Lazarevskoe Cemetery
Nikolskoe Cemetery
Tikhvin Cemetery
 Alexis Palace
 Angleterre Hotel
 Anichkov Palace
 Apraksin Dvor
 Ascension Cathedral
 Baltic Shipyard
 Baltiysky Rail Terminal
 Beloselsky-Belozersky Palace
 Belozerovs' House
 Bobrinsky Palace
 Bolshoi Theatre
 Bolshoy Dom
 Bryantsev Youth Theatre
 Cathedral of the Assumption of the Blessed Virgin Mary
 Catholic Church of St. Catherine
 Chesme Church
 Chicherin House
 Church of St. Catherine
 Church of the Epiphany
 Church of the Savior on Blood
 Ciniselli Circus
 Coastal Monastery of Saint Sergius
 Corinthia Hotel St. Petersburg
 Dacha Durnovo
 Datsan Gunzechoinei, northernmost Buddhist temple in Russia
 DLT
 Elisseeff Emporium
 Esders and Scheefhaals building
 Evangelical Lutheran Church of Saint Mary
 Finland Station
 Fort Alexander
 Fountain House
 General Staff Building
 Gothic Chapel
 Grand Choral Synagogue
 Grand Hotel Europe
 Great Gostiny Dvor
 Green Bridge
 Hermitage Museum
Hermitage Theatre
Winter Palace
 Herzen University
 Hotel Astoria
 House of Soviets
 Ice Palace (arena)
 Imperial Academy of Arts
 Ioannovsky Convent
 Kagul Obelisk
 Kamenny Island Theatre
 Karl Knipper Theatre
 Kazan Cathedral
 Kikin Hall
 Kirov Plant
 Kirov Stadium
 Kotomin House
 Kronstadt Naval Cathedral
 Kronverk
 Kunstkamera
 Kuryokhin Center
 Ladozhsky Rail Terminal
 Lakhta Center
 Library of the Russian Academy of Sciences
 Lutheran Church of Saint Peter and Saint Paul
 Mariinsky Palace, Legislative Assembly of Saint Petersburg wherein
 Mariinsky Theatre
 Mikhailovsky Theatre
 Mikhailovsky Palace
 Moika Palace
 Monument to the Fighters of the Revolution
 Monument to Nizami Ganjavi in Saint Petersburg
 Moskovsky railway station
 Moscow Triumphal Gate
 Muruzi House
 Musin-Pushkin House
 Narva Triumphal Gate
 National Library of Russia
 New Holland Island, the historical building complex
 Nicholas Palace
 Obukhov State Plant
 Okhta Center
 Oktyabrskiy Big Concert Hall
 Old Saint Petersburg Stock Exchange and Rostral Columns
 Old Trinity Cathedral
 Passage, The
 Peter and Paul Fortress
Grand Ducal Burial Vault
Peter and Paul Cathedral
Saint Petersburg Mint
 Petrovsky Stadium
 Piskaryovskoye Memorial Cemetery
 Pravda 10, St. Petersburg
 Pulkovo Airport
 Pulkovo Observatory
 Pushkin House
 Rossi Pavilion
 Rumyantsev Obelisk
 Russian Museum
Marble Palace
Mikhailovsky Palace (the main building)
Summer Palace
 Sacred Heart Church, St. Petersburg
Saint Michael's Castle
 Saint Andrew's Cathedral
 Saint Catherine's Armenian Church
 Saint Isaac's Cathedral
 Saint Petersburg City Duma
 Saint Petersburg Commodity and Stock Exchange
 Saint Petersburg Conservatory
 St. Petersburg Department of Steklov Mathematical Institute of Russian Academy of Sciences
 Saint Petersburg Lyceum 239
 Saint Petersburg Manege
 Saint Petersburg Mosque
 Saint Petersburg Sports and Concert Complex
 Saint Petersburg State Institute of Technology
 Saint Petersburg State University
 Saint Petersburg Stock Exchange
 Saint Petersburg TV Tower
 Saint Sampson's Cathedral
 Saltykov Mansion
 Saviour Church on Sennaya Square
 Sibur Arena
 Singer House
 Smolny Convent
 Smolny Institute
 Solovetsky Stone
 St. John the Baptist Church
 St. John's Church
 St. Julian's Church
 St. Nicholas Naval Cathedral
 St. Stanislaus Church
 St. Vladimir's Cathedral
 Stieglitz Museum of Applied Arts
 Summer Palace of Peter the Great
 Suvorov Museum
 Tauride Palace
 Tolstoy House
 Transfiguration Cathedral
 Trinity Cathedral
 Twelve Collegia
 Utkina Dacha
 Varshavsky Rail Terminal (former), Warsaw Express trade center wherein
 Vitebsky railway station
 Vladimirskaya Church
 Wawelberg Bank building
 Yelagin Palace
 Yubileyny Sports Palace
 Zoological Museum of the Russian Academy of Science

By type

Bridges

 Alexander Nevsky Bridge
 Anichkov Bridge
 Annunciation Bridge
 Bank Bridge
 Betancourt Bridge
 Blue Bridge
 Bolsheokhtinsky Bridge
 Bolshoy Obukhovsky Bridge
 Bolshoy Petrovsky Bridge
 Bridge of Four Lions
 Egyptian Bridge
 English Bridge
 Exchange Bridge
 Finland Railway Bridge
 First Engineer Bridge
 First Winter Bridge
 Green Bridge
 Hermitage Bridge
 Italian Bridge
 Kazansky Bridge
 Lazarevskiy Bridge
 Liteyny Bridge
 Lomonosov Bridge
 Malo-Kalinkin Bridge
 Marble Bridge
 Palace Bridge
 Panteleymonovsky Bridge
 Pevchesky Bridge
 Pochtamtsky Bridge
 Red Bridge
 Rossi Bridge
 Saint Isaac's Bridge
 Stone Bridge
 Trinity Bridge
 Tripartite Bridge
 Tuchkov Bridge
 Ushakovsky Bridge
 Volodarsky Bridge

Churches, cathedrals, and monasteries

Alexander Nevsky Lavra
Holy Trinity Cathedral
Annunciation Church
Dukhovskaya Church
Feodorovskaya Church
Gate Church
Annenkirche
Ascension Cathedral
Cathedral of the Assumption of the Blessed Virgin Mary
Chesme Church
Church of Our Lady of Kazan
Church of Our Lady the Merciful
Church of the Dormition of the Mother of God
Church of the Epiphany
Church of St. Catherine
Church of the Savior on Blood
Coastal Monastery of Saint Sergius
Evangelical Lutheran Church of Saint Catherine
Evangelical Lutheran Church of Saint Mary
Gothic Chapel
Ioannovsky Convent
Kazan Cathedral
Kronstadt Naval Cathedral
Lutheran Church of Saint Michael
Lutheran Church of Saint Peter and Saint Paul
Old Trinity Cathedral
Sacred Heart Church
Saint Andrew's Cathedral
Saint Catherine's Armenian Church
Saint Isaac's Cathedral
Saint John's Church
Saint John the Baptist Church
Saint Julian's Church
Saint Nicholas Naval Cathedral
Saints Peter and Paul Cathedral
Saint Sampson's Cathedral
Saint Stanislaus Church
Saint Vladimir's Cathedral
Saviour Church on Sennaya Square
Smolny Convent
Transfiguration Cathedral
Trinity Cathedral
Vladimirskaya Church

Hotels 

 Angleterre Hotel
 Corinthia Hotel St. Petersburg
 Grand Hotel Europe
 Hotel Astoria
 Lobanov-Rostovsky Palace
 Novotel Saint Petersburg Centre
 Oktyabrskaya Hotel
 Saint Petersburg (hotel, Saint Petersburg)

Monuments and memorials 

 Alexander Column
 Bronze Horseman
 Chesme Column
 Column of Glory
 Green Belt of Glory
 Leningrad Hero City Obelisk
 Monument to the Fighters of the Revolution
 Monument to Nicholas I
 Monument to Nizami Ganjavi in Saint Petersburg
 Monument to Peter I (Peter and Paul Fortress)
 Monument to Peter I (St. Michael's Castle)
 Rimsky-Korsakov Monument
 Solovetsky Stone

Palaces and villas 

 Alexis Palace
 Anichkov Palace
 Beloselsky-Belozersky Palace
 Gatchina Palace
 Kamenny Island Palace
 Kikin Hall
 Lobanov-Rostovsky Palace
 Marble Palace
 Mariinsky Palace
 Menshikov Palace
 Moika Palace
 Naryshkin-Shuvalov Palace
 Nevsky Prospect 86
 New Michael Palace
 Nicholas Palace
 Oranienbaum
 Pavlovsk Palace
 Peterhof Palace
Monplaisir Palace
Peterhof Grand Palace
 Saint Michael's Castle
 Saltykov Mansion
 Shuvalov Mansion
 Stroganov Palace
 Summer Palace
 Summer Palace of Peter the Great
 Tauride Palace
 Tsarskoye Selo
Alexander Palace
Catherine Palace
Amber Room
Sophia Cathedral
Tsarskoye Selo Lyceum
 Vladimir Palace
 Vorontsov Palace
 Winter Palace
Neva Enfilade of the Winter Palace
Private Apartments of the Winter Palace
 Yelagin Palace

Shopping malls and markets 
 

 Apraksin Dvor
 DLT 
 Galeria
 Great Gostiny Dvor
 Nikolsky Market
 Passage

Sports venues 

 Ice Palace
 Krestovsky Stadium
 Petrovsky Stadium
 Saint Petersburg Sports and Concert Complex
 Yubileyny Sports Palace

Theatres 

 Alexandrinsky Theatre
 Baltic House Festival Theatre
 Bolshoi Theatre
 Hermitage Theatre
 Kamenny Island Theatre
 Komedianty Theatre
 Liteiny Theatre
 Mariinsky Theatre
 Ostrov Theatre
 Saint Petersburg Comedy Theatre
 Tovstonogov Bolshoi Drama Theater
 Youth Theatre on the Fontanka
 Zazerkalie

Towers 
 Griffins' tower
 Lesnoy Mole Rear Range Light
 Pevcheskaya Tower
 Ruin Tower
 Saint Petersburg TV Tower

See also
 Timeline of Saint Petersburg

References

Saint Petersburg
Buildings